Cormery is a commune in the Indre-et-Loire department, Centre-Val de Loire. Its inhabitants are called Cormeriens, Cormeriennes.

Geography 
Cormery is located 21 kilometres from Tours and 18 kilometres from Joué-lès-Tours. The area of the town is watered by the Indre river.

History

Cormery Abbey 

In 791, a religious institution was founded by Ithier of St. Martin, abbot of Basilica of St. Martin in Tours and prochancelier of Charlemagne. This edifice was to create a more friendly place for meditation and prayer, plus respect for the rule of Saint Benedict of Nursia. Ithier come here to retreat from the world and its agitations. The modest priory was first called Celle Saint-Paul. Alcuin who succeeded Ithier Cormery led a tremendous spiritual growth and materially transformed the priory into an important abbey by donating important areas. This allowed his successor, Fridugisus, to perform great works.

A protective shadow of the abbey caused many residents to gather and a town was formed which became an important commercial center: since 845 a market is held every Thursday. 
During the raids of the Vikings up the Loire river, the monks of Saint-Martin first put the holy relics in their safe in Cormery before forced to flee to the east.

The abbey was in ruins in the early eleventh century and was rededicated in 1054. In 1268 to 1271, the abbot was Jean de Brosse, parent of Pierre de Brosse, and close to Philip II of France according to Le Hardi.

In 1562, Cormery was sacked by Huguenots during the Huguenot rebellions. In 1662, the congregation of St Maur recreated a monastic community that would last until the French Revolution when the monastery was resolved.

Only impressive remains are left of the abbey which is objects of study by historians of the region and a cookie recipe "macaroons Abbey".

List of mayors

Heraldry

Drinking water management 
The town of Cormery is part of the SIPTEC (Syndicat Intercommunal de Truyes-Esvres-Cormery).

Demographics

Places and monuments 
 
 A lantern of the dead from the twelfth century. Declared a historical monument on December 1, 1920 as a lantern of the dead. (It seems that this is actually a hosanna cross).
 Benedictine abbey: founded in 791 by Ithier, abbot of Saint Martin of Tours 
 The Chapel of the Virgin: Built at the end of the 15th century.
 The rectory: Built in the 15th century.

Personalities linked to the town 
 Ithier of Saint Martin
 Paul Boyer (slavist) (1864–1949), was born in Cormery

Bibliography

See also
Communes of the Indre-et-Loire department

References

External links 

 

Communes of Indre-et-Loire
Touraine